Hamidiye, historically Danacık, is a village in the Nurdağı District, Gaziantep Province, Turkey. The village is populated by Kabardian Circassians and had a population of 423 in 2022.

References

Villages in Nurdağı District